Chhanamukhi ( chanamukhi, from  chana, “cottage cheese”) is a Bangladeshi sweet. It originated in the Brahmanbaria District. It is made with fried cottage cheese and sugar syrup.

See also
List of Bangladeshi sweets and desserts

References

Brahmanbaria District
Bangladeshi desserts